The Martyrs' Square; known as Green Yard under the Gaddafi government;  Independence Square during the monarchy; and originally (during Italian colonial rule) known as Piazza Italia ("Italy Square") is a downtown landmark at the bay in the city of Tripoli, Libya. The main commercial center of the city surrounds the square. The Square is also a main tourist attraction in Tripoli. It has a large legendary fountain done by an Italian architect at the centre of the square. The square is the meeting point of many different avenues. Omar Mukhtar Avenue is one of the longest in North Africa, it was built by Italians in the colonial time, and Libyans during the era of King Idris I. Independence Street branches from the square too, and it leads to the Palace of King Idris I. 24 December Avenue is also an Italian built avenue. Mizran Street is the last street that branches from the Martyrs' Square.

History 

The square was originally constructed by the Italian colonial rulers on the site of the old bread market (sūq al-khubs), and it was expanded on several occasions during the 1930s.

During the Italian colonial period, it was called Piazza Italia ("Italy Square"). After Libyan independence in 1951, it was known as "Independence Square"  during the Libyan monarchy (1951–1969). After the 1969 revolution by Gaddafi, the square was renamed again to "Green Square" to mark his political philosophy in his Green Book.

2011 Libyan civil war
On the night of 21–22 August, Libyan rebel groups took control of the area during the 2011 Battle of Tripoli and started referring to it as Martyrs' Square to dissociate the square from the Gaddafi government and to commemorate those who died in the fight against his government. On Eid ul-Fitr (31 August) and again on 2 September, tens of thousands of Tripoli residents, including many women and children, gathered on Martyrs' Square to celebrate the end of Gaddafi's rule.

Facilities
It features the Red Castle (As-saraya Al-hamra), which hosts Libya's Antiquities Department and the National Museum with a collection of Phoenician, Greek and Roman artefacts. The museum also exhibits a statue of Venus from the Hadrianic Baths at Leptis, a complete Libyan-Roman tomb from the Ghirza region, and a colourful Volkswagen Beetle used by Colonel Gaddafi leading up to the revolution. On the other side, a wide avenue leading towards the seafront with two tall pillars. On top of the pillars are an iron-cast, miniature wooden ship; the other one features a horseback rider.

The Royal Miramare Theatre used to be located across from the Red Castle, but it was demolished by Gaddafi's government after the 1960s to create space for large demonstrations.

See also

References

External links 

National squares
Squares in Libya
Tripoli, Libya
First Libyan Civil War